Cedar Crest is a census-designated place (CDP) in the town of Marshfield, Plymouth County, Massachusetts, United States. It is named for a hill on the north side of Careswell Street. It is bordered to the south by the town of Duxbury and to the southeast by the community of Green Harbor.

Cedar Crest was first listed as a CDP prior to the 2020 census. At the 2010 census, Cedar Crest and neighboring Green Harbor were part of a single CDP known as Green Harbor-Cedar Crest.

Demographics

History
The original name for Cedar Crest was "Gotham Hill". In the 1920s, three seasonal children's camps were created on the west end of the hill. The Immaculate Conception Boys Brigade, under the direction of Monsignor Edward M. Hartigan from the Immaculate Conception Church in Everett, bought out the other two camps and created one camp. At the time the hill did not have any trees since it had been farmland for a number of years. There was a growth of small cedar trees on the top of the hill. This inspired Monsignor Hartigan to name the combined camps "Cedar Crest", and the name was emblazoned on the side of the hill in white painted stones. Ever since, the entire hill has been called Cedar Crest.

References 

Census-designated places in Plymouth County, Massachusetts
Census-designated places in Massachusetts